USS Braziliera was a bark acquired by the Union Navy during the American Civil War. She was used by the Union Navy primarily as a gunboat stationed off Confederate ports to prevent their trading with foreign countries.

Built in Baltimore, Maryland, in 1861
Braziliera — a wooden bark — was built in 1856 by J. J. Abrahams, Baltimore, Maryland; purchased at New York City on July 30, 1861; and commissioned on October 27, 1861, Acting Volunteer  Lieutenant C. F. W. Behm in command.

Civil War service

Assigned to the North Atlantic Blockade
She joined the North Atlantic Blockading Squadron and served on the blockade of Beaufort, North Carolina. On March 3, 1862, Braziliera received considerable damage when the bark  dragged anchor at Hampton Roads, Virginia, and collided with her.

Reassigned to the South Atlantic Blockade
On June 27, Braziliera reported to the South Atlantic Blockading Squadron. While with the Squadron she captured four vessels. She also took part in the destruction of salt works on St. Simon's Sound, Georgia, and lumberworks on St. Andrew Bay, Florida.

In May 1864, she assisted in defeating the attack of CSS North Carolina at the mouth of the Cape Fear River, North Carolina.

Post-war decommissioning and sale
Braziliera was sold on June 2, 1865 at Philadelphia, Pennsylvania.

References

Ships of the Union Navy
Gunboats of the United States Navy
Barques of the United States Navy
American Civil War patrol vessels of the United States
Ships built in Baltimore
1856 ships